This is a list of electoral results for the Electoral district of Roebourne in Western Australian state elections.

Members for Roebourne

Election results

Elections in the 1940s

Elections in the 1930s

Elections in the 1920s

 Preferences were not distributed.

Elections in the 1910s

 Preferences were not distributed.

Elections in the 1900s

Elections in the 1890s

References

Western Australian state electoral results by district